is a railway station in Kokura Minami-ku, Kitakyushu, Japan, operated by Kyushu Railway Company (JR Kyushu).

Lines
Jōno Station is served by the Nippō Main Line as well as the Hitahikosan Line, of which it is the northern terminus.

Passenger statistics
In fiscal 2016, the station was used by an average of 4,276 passengers daily (boarding passengers only), and it ranked 48th among the busiest stations of JR Kyushu.

See also
List of railway stations in Japan

References

External links

  

Railway stations in Fukuoka Prefecture
Buildings and structures in Kitakyushu
Railway stations in Japan opened in 1895